Patrick Daka (born 6 September 1975 in Harare) is a Zimbabwean footballer who last played for Charlotte Eagles in the USL Second Division.

Career

Early career
Daka began his career in his native Zimbabwe. At age 19, Daka signed with Hessen Kassel F.C in Germany in 1995 and played two seasons with them. He played games against Borussia Dortmund, Bayern Munich and Stuttgart to name a few scoring a magical goal in the 90th minute against Borussia Dortmund in Kassel.

He played for Black Aces and Darryn T in the Zimbabwe Premier Soccer League.

College
Daka moved to the United States in 2001, and subsequently played two years of college soccer at Western Baptist College (now Corban University), where he earned many honours including NAIA All-American, College Male Athlete of the Year, NAIA National Championship Most Outstanding Offensive Player and All-Conference Honors. During his college years he also played with Cascade Surge in the USL Premier Development League.

Professional
His first USA signing was with the Charlotte Eagles in the Pro Soccer League in 2004, and has been with the team ever since. He made his professional debut on 15 May 2004, scoring a goal in Charlotte's 3–2 win over the Northern Virginia Royals. He has since gone on to make more than 100 appearances for the Eagles.

Daka was not listed on the 2011 roster for Charlotte.
He is now on the club's coaching staff.

International
Daka is a former full member of the Zimbabwe national football team, having played for the Warriors in the COSAFA Cup in 1998 and 1999, World Cup qualifiers, African Cup qualifiers, and in numerous friendlies.

Personal life
Daka now coaches youth soccer at Charlotte Soccer Academy and offers camps for youth throughout the year.

References

External links
 Charlotte Eagles bio
 Daka Soccer Academy – Personal Youth Soccer Training

1975 births
Living people
Sportspeople from Harare
Zimbabwean footballers
Black Aces FC players
Free State Stars F.C. players
Cascade Surge players
Charlotte Eagles players
USL Second Division players
USL League Two players
Corban University alumni
Expatriate soccer players in South Africa
Zimbabwean expatriate sportspeople in South Africa
Expatriate soccer players in the United States
Zimbabwean expatriate sportspeople in the United States
Zimbabwean expatriate footballers
Association football midfielders
Association football forwards
Zimbabwe international footballers